Baie St. Paul is a  lake freighter operated on the Great Lakes by the Canada Steamship Lines (CSL). The ship entered service in 2012.

Design and description
Baie St. Paul has a gross tonnage of 24,430 tons and a deadweight tonnage of 37,690 tons according to the Miramar Ship Index. However, according to the CSL website, Baie St. Paul has the same gross tonnage but the ship has a deadweight tonnage of 34,500 tons. The vessel has a crew of 15–18.

The freighter is powered by one IMO Tier III MAN B&W 6S50ME diesel engine driving one shaft creating .

Service history
The vessel was built at the Chengxi Shipyard in Jiangyin, China with the yard number 9301. The ship was completed in September 2012, the first vessel in CSL's Trillium class. CSL asserted that the new vessels would be more efficient than existing vessels, and would leave less pollution.

CSL operated an earlier vessel called the Baie St. Paul, launched in 1962.
She was scrapped in 1995.

References

Great Lakes freighters
Canada Steamship Lines
2012 ships
Ships built in China